Argyll and Bute is a county constituency of the House of Commons of the Parliament of the United Kingdom. It was created for the 1983 general election, merging most of Argyll with some of Bute and Northern Ayrshire.  A similar constituency, also called Argyll and Bute, is used by the Scottish Parliament.

Boundaries

1983–2005: Argyll and Bute District.

2005–present: The area of the Argyll and Bute Council.

When created in 1983, the constituency covered the area of the Argyll and Bute district of the Strathclyde region. In 2005 it was enlarged to cover the Argyll and Bute council area, which had been created in 1996. Thus Helensburgh, already included within the new council area, was included in the constituency. Helensburgh had been within the Dunbarton district until 1996, and within the Dumbarton constituency until 2005.

Politics
Argyll and Bute was one of the few four-way marginal constituencies in Britain. The Liberal Democrats held the seat from 1987, when they took it from the Conservatives, until 2015 when the SNP won the seat. The equivalent seat to Argyll and Bute in the Scottish Parliament was lost to the SNP in 2007, and was again taken by the SNP in 2011–16, with Labour representing the overlapping constituency of Dumbarton to the south-east covering Helensburgh and Lomond. Since 2017 the Scottish Conservatives have been the main challengers in the seat.

Members of Parliament

Election results

Elections in the 2010s

Elections in the 2000s

Elections in the 1990s

Elections in the 1980s

References

Westminster Parliamentary constituencies in Scotland
Constituencies of the Parliament of the United Kingdom established in 1983
Argyll and Bute